Whitesand Lake is a lake in Thunder Bay District, Ontario, Canada, part of the Hewitson River system.

It is shaped roughly like the letter "H", with an elongated and fatter lower right arm. The primary inflow is the Whitesand River at the north side of the lake, and the lake flows out at the south-west via the Hewitson River over the Rainbow Falls into Lake Superior.

Economy
A campground of Rainbow Falls Provincial Park is on the south side of Whitesand Lake near the outflow to the Hewitson River.

References

Lakes of Thunder Bay District